A civil aviation authority (CAA) is a national or supranational statutory authority that oversees the regulation of civil aviation, including the maintenance of an aircraft register.

Role
Due to the inherent dangers in the use of flight vehicles, national aviation authorities typically regulate the following critical aspects of aircraft airworthiness and their operation:

 design of aircraft, engines, airborne equipment and ground-based equipment affecting flight safety
 conditions of manufacture and testing of aircraft and equipment
 maintenance of aircraft and equipment
 operation of aircraft and equipment
 licensing of pilots, air traffic controllers, flight dispatchers and maintenance engineers
 licensing of airports and navigational aids
 standards for air traffic control.

Depending on the legal system of the jurisdiction, a CAA will derive its powers from an act of parliament (such as the Civil or Federal Aviation Act), and is then empowered to make regulations within the bounds of the act. This allows technical aspects of airworthiness to be dealt with by subject matter experts and not politicians.

A CAA may also be involved in the investigation of aircraft accidents, although in many cases this is left to a separate body (such as the Australian Transport Safety Bureau (ATSB) in Australia or the National Transportation Safety Board (NTSB) in the United States), to allow independent review of regulatory oversight.

A CAA will regulate the control of air traffic but a separate agency will generally carry out air traffic control functions.

In some countries a CAA may build and operate airports, including non-airside operations such as passenger terminals; the Civil Aviation Authority of Nepal and the Civil Aviation Authority of the Philippines being among such authorities. In other countries, private companies or local government authorities may own and operate individual airports.

Civil aviation authorities do not regulate military aviation. Military aviation will typically have a completely separate personnel licensing system. In the United Kingdom, military aviation is regulated by the Military Aviation Authority.

The International Civil Aviation Organization (ICAO) refers to civil aviation authorities as National Airworthiness Authorities (NAA), particularly when referring to an authority in its capacity as an airworthiness authority; or sometimes as National Aviation Authorities (also NAA). EASA refers to them as National Aviation Authorities.

History
The independent development of CAAs resulted in differing regulations from country to country. This required aircraft manufacturers in the past to develop different models for specific national requirements (such as the BAe Jetstream 31), and impeded airline travel into foreign jurisdictions. The Convention on International Civil Aviation (Chicago Convention) was signed in 1944 and addressed these issues. This then led to the establishment by the United Nations of the International Civil Aviation Organization (ICAO) in 1947 which now oversees member states, and works to implement regulatory changes to ensure that best practice regulations are adopted.

The Joint Aviation Authorities (JAA) was founded in 1970, for cooperation between European CAAs. It published the Joint Aviation Requirements (JAR), to create minimum standards across agencies. It was replaced by the European Aviation Safety Agency and disbanded in 2009.

The European Aviation Safety Agency (EASA) was created in 2003 as an agency of the European Union, replacing the Joint Aviation Authorities. It standardises aviation regulations across the European Union and the European Free Trade Association. Member states continue to have their own agencies, which implement EASA rules. EASA has working relationships with non-member states including Armenia, Georgia, Moldova and Ukraine. It was renamed the European Union Aviation Safety Agency in 2018.

List of civil aviation authorities
This is a list of national and supra-national civil aviation authorities.

See also

 Air route authority between the United States and China
Federal Aviation Regulations

References

External links
 International civil aviation regulatory & government agencies
 More civil aviation authorities
 Free Aviation Dictionary
 International Society of Air Safety Investigators (Government Air Safety Investigators Group Directory)

Civil aviation authorities
Aviation law
Lists of aviation organizations

hr:Agencija za civilno zrakoplovstvo